Rachmaninoff is a impact crater on Mercury. This basin, first imaged in its entirety during MESSENGERs third Mercury flyby, was quickly identified as a feature of high scientific interest, because of its fresh appearance, its distinctively colored interior plains, and the extensional troughs on its floor. The morphology of Rachmaninoff is similar to that of Raditladi, which is one of the youngest impact basins on Mercury. The age of Raditladi is estimated at one billion years. Rachmaninoff appears to be only slightly older.

The central part of Rachmaninoff is occupied by a peak ring 130 km in diameter and somewhat elongated in the north–south direction. The area within it is covered by bright reddish smooth plains, which are different in color from the plains outside the peak ring. These plains are likely to be of volcanic origin because they show signs of flow. They also over-topped and covered the southern portion of the peak ring itself.  The lowest recorded elevation on Mercury, 5380 meters below the global average, lies within Rachmaninoff Basin.  Rachmaninoff is one of 110 peak ring basins on Mercury.

The smooth plains inside the peak ring were deformed by a set of concentric graben (troughs) much like those inside Raditladi. The troughs are located at half the distance to the peak ring from the center of the crater. Rachmaninoff is the fourth impact crater on Mercury (after Caloris, Rembrandt and Raditladi), where extensional tectonic features have been observed. The formation mechanism of the graben remains unknown.

The crater is named after Sergei Rachmaninoff, a Russian composer, pianist, and conductor (1873–1943).

A distinct bright area between the inner peak ring and the rim in the southeast portion of the crater is known as Suge Facula.

Views

References

Impact craters on Mercury
Sergei Rachmaninoff